Fougères Agglomération is the communauté d'agglomération, an intercommunal structure, centred on the town of Fougères. It is located in the Ille-et-Vilaine department, in the Brittany region, northwestern France. Created in 2017, its seat is in La Selle-en-Luitré. Its area is 538.7 km2. Its population was 55,874 in 2019, of which 20,595 in Fougères proper.

Composition
The communauté d'agglomération consists of the following 29 communes:

La Bazouge-du-Désert
Beaucé
Billé
La Chapelle-Janson
La Chapelle-Saint-Aubert
Combourtillé
Le Ferré
Fleurigné
Fougères
Javené
Laignelet
Landéan
Lécousse
Le Loroux
Louvigné-du-Désert
Luitré-Dompierre
Mellé
Monthault
Parcé
Parigné
Poilley
Rives-du-Couesnon
Romagné
Saint-Christophe-de-Valains
Saint-Georges-de-Reintembault
Saint-Ouen-des-Alleux
Saint-Sauveur-des-Landes
La Selle-en-Luitré
Villamée

References

Fougeres
Fougeres